Science City may refer to:

Cities 
 Muñoz, Nueva Ecija, officially Science City of Muñoz since 2000, Philippines
 Kansai Science City, Japan

Campuses and research centers 
 Science City Kolkata, a national science center in Kolkata, West Bengal, India
includes the Science City Auditorium, part of an attached convention center
 Guangzhou Science City, a technology center in Guangzhou, China
 Gujarat Science City, an education center in Ahmedabad, Gujarat, India
 Pushpa Gujral Science City, an educational science center in Kapurthala, Punjab, India
 Jaipur Science City

Other uses
 Science City at Union Station, a science museum in Kansas City, Missouri, United States
 Science City Jena, a basketball team in Jena, Germany
 Canada South Science City, a science museum in Windsor, Ontario, Canada
 ETH Zurich#Hönggerberg campus, a sustainability project in Switzerland

See also
 City of Science and Industry, a science museum in Paris, France
 City of Arts and Sciences, a cultural and architectural complex in Valencia, Spain
 Masdar City (literally "Source City"), a planned city in Abu Dhabi
 Stifterverband für die Deutsche Wissenschaft, an organization that awards "City of Science" designations in Germany
 Naukograd, the Soviet designation of certain cities